Michael Eilbaum is an American television soap opera director.

Directing Credits
Another World
 Director (1980-1999)

As the World Turns
 Director (1999-2010)

One Life to Live
 Director (September 2010-January 2012)

Hollywood Heights
 Director (June 27-October 3, 2012)

The Young and the Restless
 Director (October 17, 2012 – present)

Awards and nominations
Daytime Emmy Award
Win, 2000,2001,2007 Directing Team, As the World Turns
Nomination, 2002, 2003, Directing Team, As the World Turns
Nomination, 1992, 1993, 1995, Directing Team, Another World
Win, 1992, Directing Team, Another World

References

External links

Living people
Place of birth missing (living people)
Year of birth missing (living people)
American television directors
American soap opera directors